The 1997 Pop Cola Bottlers season was the eighth season of the franchise in the Philippine Basketball Association (PBA).

Draft picks

Notable dates
February 22: Pop Cola stuns defending champion Alaska Milkmen, 96–88 in Lipa City, Batangas, for their first win in two starts.

September 20: Vergel Meneses tallied a game-high 36 points, and import Byron Houston added 29 points with 19 rebounds as Pop Cola gave their new coach Norman Black his first win at the start of the Governor's Cup with a 108–92 victory over Purefoods in the out-of-town game in Tarlac State University Gym.

Occurrences
Starting the Commissioners Cup, coach Derrick Pumaren was replaced by Arturo Valenzona, whose last coaching job in the PBA was nine years ago. Valenzona chooses Alfrancis Chua as his assistant coach while Pumaren remain as a team consultant.

After Pop Cola's failure to reach the semifinals for the fifth straight time, a player-coach trade took place between the two teams that didn't make past the eliminations in the Commissioner's Cup, the Bottlers acquired Norman Black from Mobiline as their head coach along with Elpidio Villamin and Peter Martin in exchange for guard Ato Agustin and their former coach Derrick Pumaren, who has now moved over to the Mobiline camp. Upon Norman Black's entry at Pop Cola, Alfrancis Chua was retain as assistant coach while Arturo Valenzona was relegated to team consultant.

Roster

Transactions

Additions

Trades

Recruited imports

References

Pop Cola
Pop Cola Panthers seasons